CITL may represent:

 CITL-TV, a television station in Lloydminster, Alberta/Saskatchewan
 An acronym for CIT Laurentides